Muhammadpur Diwan is a town in Tehsil Jampur  District Rajanpur, Punjab, Pakistan. It is situated 20 km from Jampur and 46km from Rajanpur on the Indus Highway.

The town currently houses around 12,000 people.

The main occupational focus of the town is agriculture, and the town has many cotton factories which give jobs to about 60% of the population.

Educational institutions 

 Government higher secondary school Muhammadpur Diwan for boys
 Government High school for girls 
 Afaq Model High School Muhammad Pur Diwan 
 Al-Razi Model High School Muhammad Pur Diwan 
 Hamdard Model High School Muhammad Pur Diwan 

Although there are enough schools until matriculation here, there is no college for girls or boys in this town of almost twelve thousand.  

Populated places in Rajanpur District